Marine Corps Base Camp Lejeune is a  United States military training facility in Jacksonville, North Carolina. Its  of beaches make the base a major area for amphibious assault training, and its location between two deep-water ports (Wilmington and Morehead City) allows for fast deployments. The main base is supplemented by six satellite facilities: Marine Corps Air Station New River, Camp Geiger, Stone Bay, Courthouse Bay, Camp Johnson, and the Greater Sandy Run Training Area. The Marine Corps port facility is in Beaufort, at the southern tip of Radio Island (between the NC State Port in Morehead City, and the marine science laboratories on Pivers Island in Beaufort). It is occupied only during military port operations.

Facilities
Camp Lejeune encompasses 156,000 acres, with 18 kilometers of beach capable of supporting amphibious operations, 32 gun positions, 48 tactical landing zones, three state-of-the-art training facilities for Military Operations in Urban Terrain and 80 live fire ranges to include the Greater Sandy Run Training Area.  Military forces from around the world come to Camp Lejeune on a regular basis for bilateral and NATO-sponsored exercises.

Resident commands at Camp Lejeune include:

 II Marine Expeditionary Force
 Marine Corps Forces Special Operations Command
 2nd Marine Division
 2nd Marine Logistics Group
 2nd Marine Expeditionary Brigade
 22nd Marine Expeditionary Unit
 24th Marine Expeditionary Unit
 26th Marine Expeditionary Unit
 2nd Reconnaissance Battalion
 2nd Intelligence Battalion
 Marine Corps Installations East
 Marine Corps Engineer School
 United States Marine Corps School of Infantry
 Marine Corps Combat Service Support Schools
 Reserve Support Unit
 Naval Hospital Camp Lejeune
 Field Medical Training Battalion (FMTB)
 Joint Maritime Training Center (USCG)
 Marine Raider Regiment
 Marine Special Operations Support Group

Recreation & Fitness:

Auto Skills Center, Bowling, Community Centers, Golf Course, Inline Hockey, Marinas, Paintball, Movie Theater, Onslow Beach Facilities, Outdoor Adventures Center, Pools, Fishing, Hunting, Beach Camping, Recreational Shooting, E-sports Center, Recreational Equipment Checkout & Rentals, Skate Park, and a large number of Sports and Gym facilities.

History 

In April 1941, construction was approved on an  tract in Onslow County, North Carolina. On May 1 of that year, Lieutenant Colonel William P. T. Hill began construction on Marine Barracks New River. The first base headquarters was in a summer cottage on Montford Point and then moved to Hadnot Point in 1942. Later that year it was renamed in honor of the 13th Commandant of the Marine Corps, John A. Lejeune, upon his death.

One of the satellite facilities of Camp Lejeune served for a while as a third boot camp for the Marines, in addition to Parris Island and San Diego. That facility, Montford Point, was established after Franklin D. Roosevelt signed Executive Order 8802. Between 1942 and 1949, a brief era of segregated training for black Marines, the camp at Montford Point trained 20,000 African-Americans. After the military was ordered to fully integrate, Montford Point was renamed Camp Gilbert H. Johnson and became the home of the Marine Corps Combat Service Support Schools.

On May 10, 1996, two helicopters performing a joint United-States/British training exercise collided and crashed into a swampy wooded area, killing fourteen and injuring two.

In mid-September 2018, Hurricane Florence damaged IT systems and over 900 buildings in the camp, leading to a $3.6 billion repair cost. 70 percent of base housing was damaged and 84,000 gallons of sewage were released.

Drinking water contamination

From at least 1957 through 1987, Marines and their families at Lejeune drank and bathed in water contaminated with toxicants at concentrations 240 to 3,400 times permitted by safety standards. A 1974 base order required safe disposal of solvents and warned that improper handling could cause drinking water contamination, yet solvents were dumped or buried near base wells for years. The base's wells were shut off in the mid-1980s but were placed back online in violation of the law. In 1982, volatile organic compounds (VOCs) were found in Camp Lejeune's drinking water supply. VOC contamination of groundwater can cause birth defects and other ill health effects in pregnant and nursing mothers. This information was not made public for nearly two decades when the government attempted to identify those who may have been exposed.

An advocacy group called The Few, The Proud, The Forgotten was created to inform possible victims of the contamination at Lejeune. The group's website includes an introduction with some basic information about the contamination at Lejeune, including that many health problems various types of cancer, leukemia, miscarriages and birth defects, have been noted in people who drank the contaminated water. According to the site, numerous base housing areas were affected by the contamination, including Tarawa Terrace, Midway Park, Berkeley Manor, Paradise Point, Hadnot Point, Hospital Point, and Watkins Village. As many as 500,000 people may have been exposed to contaminated water at Camp Lejeune over a period of 30 years.

Camp LeJeune Justice Act of 2022 
Efforts to create a Camp LeJeune Justice Act in 2021 failed, but the effort was renewed in 2022 when Camp LeJeune Justice Act became Section 706 of the SFC Heath Robinson Honoring Our PACT Act, H.R. 3967. The U.S. House passed H.R. 3967 on March 3, 2022, by a vote of 256–174. The U.S. Senate passed H.R. 3967 with some minor amendments on June 16, 2022, by a vote of 84–14. Following the bill’s passage in the U.S. Senate, President Biden's White House made a celebratory statement that included mention of Camp LeJeune victims. There were constitutional taxation problems with the amended version and a "blue slip" was issued causing the matter to return to the U.S. House. The U.S. House made the changes necessary to avoid the constitutional issue and passed the PACT Act on July 13, 2022, by a vote of 342–88. This new PACT Act was repackaged as S. 3373 with the Camp LeJeune Justice Act set as Section 804. Some Republican senators changed their votes and refused cloture on July 27, 2022, by a vote of 55-42. After several days of veterans protesting at the Capitol, there was another vote on S. 3373 and this time it passed by a vote of 86-11 on August 2, 2022. The bill was signed into law by President Biden on August 10, 2022.

This law passed in its final form in both houses of Congress with a higher percentage of the vote than the 14th Amendment to the U.S. Constitution when it passed. Public Law 117-168, SEC. 804; 136 Stat. 1802-1804.

The language of Section 804 provides for monetary relief for those injured by exposure to the Camp LeJeune base and its toxic water. Thirty days of "living" or "working" or "otherwise" being exposed between 1953 and 1987 is the prerequisite for compensation. This includes in-utero exposure. Harms must be demonstrated and they must be associated with some condition caused by the base toxicants. Some of the possible conditions may include those listed for the Janey Ensminger Act of 2012. 38 C.F.R. 17.400(b).

Litigation 

At least 850 former residents filed claims for nearly $4 billion from the military.  The multi-district litigation, MDL-2218, was dismissed on North Carolina statute of repose grounds on December 5, 2016, and the appeal to the 11th Circuit failed (Straw, et. al. v. United States, 16-17573).  The U.S. Supreme Court refused certiorari.  A U.S. Supreme Court ruling in June 2014 potentially curbs groundwater contamination lawsuits by families at Camp Lejeune. Federal law, which imposes a two-year statute of limitations after the harm is discovered, preempts North Carolina's 10-year statute of repose law. State lawmakers are trying to eliminate the state prohibition on lawsuits being filed 10 years after the last pollution occurred or from the time a polluted property was sold.  The Camp LeJeune Justice Act of 2022, Section 804(b) of the PACT Act, S. 3373, completely reverses this failure to provide justice to the victims. Public Law 117-168, SEC. 804(b), 136 Stat. 1802-1804.

Disability activist, lawyer, columnist, and politician, Andrew U. D. Straw, has appealed this case unsuccessfully.  He has also pursued claims at the U.S. Court of Federal Claims, stating that the U.S. Marine Corps' UCMJ responsibilities imply a contract to protect U.S. Marine Corps family members (Straw v. United States, 1:17-cv-00560, U.S. COFC).  This case was dismissed and denied on appeal.  Straw has advocated for legislative reform to avoid the legal arguments of the Department of Justice.  The main chemicals involved were trichloroethylene (TCE, a degreaser), perchloroethylene (PCE, a dry cleaning solvent), and benzene; however, more than 70 chemicals have been identified as contaminants at Lejeune.  Andrew Straw has hired a mass tort national law firm for his own infant brain injury and for the wrongful death of his mother from a Camp LeJeune cancer.

Straw has sought not only compensation, but he also has sought health care under the Janey Ensminger Act of 2012.  He litigated for that benefit for seven years.  He was rejected at the VA, the BVA, the U.S. Court of Veterans Claims, and finally in 2021 at the Federal Circuit.  Despite Straw being born at Camp LeJeune in 1969, his having 19 months of base access while his father worked there as a U.S. Marine, the language of the Janey Ensminger Act was interpreted narrowly so as to deny Straw this benefit.  Straw's parents had a home off base and this is where they slept, even while using and working at the base during the day from 1968–1970.  The fact that Straw's mother died from one of the cancers listed in the Act and Straw having neurobehavioral effects listed in the Act was irrelevant to the Federal Circuit.  The Federal Circuit also refused to consider the misapplication of the North Carolina Statute of Repose as being a taking of private property.  Straw v. Wilkie, 843 F. App’x 263 (Fed. Cir. 1/15/2021); Straw v. United States, 4 F.4th 1358 (Fed. Cir. 2021).  The narrow construction of the Janey Ensminger Act of 2012 in Straw's case led to the Camp LeJeune Justice Act of 2022 having no such on-base limitation.  The new 2022 law provides a catch-all "otherwise exposed" inclusive provision so such exclusion for sleeping off base cannot be used to deny the relief.

On March 8, 2010, Paul Buckley of Hanover, Massachusetts, received a 100 percent, service connected disability from the Department of Veterans Affairs for cancer (multiple myeloma), which was linked to toxic water exposure on Camp Lejeune. This is believed to be the first time the government has admitted the link between the contamination and illnesses.

In 2007, Jerry Ensminger, a retired Marine master sergeant, found a document dated 1981 that described a radioactive dump site near a rifle range at the camp. According to the report, the waste was laced with strontium-90, an isotope known to cause cancer and leukemia. According to Camp Lejeune's installation restoration program manager, base officials learned about the document in 2004. Ensminger served in the Marine Corps for 24 and a half years and lived for part of that time at Camp Lejeune. In 1985, his nine-year-old daughter, Janey, died of cancer.  Straw's mother died in 1997 from breast cancer.

On July 6, 2009, Laura Jones filed suit against the U.S. government over the contaminated water at the base.  Jones previously lived at the base where her husband, a Marine, was stationed, and she has since been diagnosed with lymphoma. Twenty former residents of Camp Lejeune—all men who lived there during the 1960s and the 1980s—have been diagnosed with breast cancer. In April 2009, the United States Agency for Toxic Substances and Disease Registry withdrew a 1997 public health assessment at Camp Lejeune that denied any connection between the toxicants and illness.

President Biden signed the Camp Lejeune Justice Act of 2022, allowing victims to sue for sicknesses related to water contamination at Camp Lejeune. This law passed in its final form in both houses of Congress with a higher percentage of the vote than the 14th Amendment to the U.S. Constitution when it passed.

Straw has renewed his claims for compensation. Straw v. United States, 7:23-cv-162-BO-BM (E.D.N.C.) (Camp LeJeune Justice Act lawsuit, docketed 2/21/2023). The Estate of Straw's mother also has a claim pending at U.S. Navy JAG Code 15 for her wrongful death from breast cancer.

One of the DOJ lawyers involved in denial of relief under FTCA in MDL-2218, Adam Bain, has appeared again in a CLJA case filing. Estate of Jane Ensminger v. United States, 7:23-cv-161 (E.D.N.C.)

Janey Ensminger Act
In July 2012, the U.S. Senate passed a bill, called the Janey Ensminger Act in honor of retired Marine Master Sergeant Jerry Ensminger's daughter Janey who died of cancer at age 9, authorizing medical care to military and family members who had resided at the base between 1957 and 1987 and developed conditions linked to the water contamination.  The measure applies to up to 750,000 people. The bill applies to 15 specific ailments believed to be linked to the contamination, including cancer of the esophagus, lung, breast, bladder or kidney; leukemia; multiple myeloma; myleodysplasic syndromes; renal toxicity; hepatic steatosis; female infertility; miscarriage; scleroderma; and/or neurobehavioral effects or non-Hodgkin's lymphoma.  The Department of Veterans Affairs is assigned to provide the medical care. To fund the medical care, the bill extended higher fees for VA home loan guarantees through 2017.  This health coverage was worded to require the victim to have lived on the base and anyone who slept off base was excluded regardless of getting the illnesses on the list.  Straw v. Wilkie, 843 F. App’x 263 (Fed. Cir. 1/15/2021).

Education
Residents are zoned to schools of the Department of Defense Education Activity (DoDEA). Different housing areas are zoned to the following:

 Heroes Elementary School: Heroes Manor and parts of Berkeley Manor and Paradise Point
 Johnson Primary School and Bitz Intermediate School: Courthouse Bay, Hospital Point, Watkins Grove, Watkins Village, and parts of Berkeley Manor and Paradise Point
 Tarawa Terrace Elementary School: Knox Cove, Knox Landing, Midway Park, and Tarawa Terrace

All residents of Camp Lejeune and of Marine Corps Air Station New River (which has Delalio Elementary) are zoned to Brewster Middle School and Lejeune High School.

See also

 Camp Lejeune Cell, an Atomwaffen Division cell found on the camp
 Camp Lejeune Incident
 Lejeune High School, located on base, serving military dependents
 List of United States Marine Corps installations
 Marine Corps Air Station New River
 Museum of the Marine
 Murder of Maria Lauterbach, a lance corporal stationed at Camp Lejeune who was murdered in December 2007

References
This article incorporates text in the public domain from the United States Marine Corps.

External links

 The Official Website of Marine Corps Base Camp Lejeune
 An Insider's Guide to USMC Bases
 Video summary of findings at Camp Lejeune Study
 The Few, The Proud, The Forgotten
 Camp Lejeune Vets/Personnel - search through Camp Lejeune vets and personnel at GIsearch
 Camp Lejeune official website, including a history of Camp Lejeune
 Camp Lejeune Globe, military-authorized newspaper
 Montford Point Marines Honored at DoD Observance, a February 2006 AFIS press release
 Onslow Beach - an introduction - article with image gallery of military training exercises, at Citizendium
 Agency for Toxic Substances and Disease Registry - Camp Lejeune, North Carolina: Water Modeling
 An inside look at the base brig at www.lejeune.usmc.mil
 "Camp Lejeune MCIEAST Regional Brig." Moseley Architects.
 USMC Camp Lejeune Base Overview & PCS Information (MarineCorpsUSA.org)
 Camp Lejeune Directory
 Camp Lejeune Satellite Images and Directory

1941 establishments in North Carolina
Military camps in the United States
Military installations established in 1941
Military installations in North Carolina
Military prisons in the United States
Military Superfund sites
Populated coastal places in North Carolina
Populated places in Onslow County, North Carolina
Superfund sites in North Carolina
United States Marine Corps bases
World War II sites in the United States